The central acquisition radar (3D-CAR) is a 3D radar developed by DRDO for use with Akash SAM capable of tracking 150 targets.

Details
Central acquisition radar (CAR) is a medium-range high-resolution 3D surveillance radar. Central acquisition radar was designed by LRDE, a DRDO laboratory, and is produced by a joint venture between BEL, Larsen & Toubro, Astra Microwave and Entec. The radar employs a planar array antenna and provides simultaneous multi-beam coverage. It can handle 150 targets in track while scan mode and has a range of more than 200 km and up to 18 km altitude.

Features
These features relate to the 3D CAR radar. Specifications for the Rohini, 3D TCR and Revathi are available in the links below.

Medium-range 3D surveillance
S band operation
Surveillance range more than 200 km
Covers elevation of 18 km in height
High-altitude deployability
Deployment in less than 20 minutes
150 Targets in TWS
Array of ECCM features
Integrated IFF
Capable of detecting low-altitude targets, and also supersonic aircraft flying at over Mach 3 speed
Frequency agility and jammer analysis

Variants 
DRDO has further developed its into three variants which are:
Rohini
The Rohini radar is mounted on a modified TATRA heavy truck and supported by a mobile auxiliary power unit. The TATRA is license manufactured by Bharat Earth Movers Limited (BEML).
Revathi
Revathi is the ship-borne secondary surveillance radar especially designed for the navy to search the air and sea target. The radar can auto track up to 150 targets including tracking. There are three Antenna Rotation Rates (ARR) of 6, 12, 24 RPMs. The radar has ECCM features.
Revathi radar is used to equip the 4 Kamorta-class corvettes.
3D TCR
It has been developed for Indian Army, with a tracking range of 90 km. The radar has a lower antenna mount and is packaged in two vehicles instead of three for the Rohini. It can also feed data to a weapons station 20 km away. It is currently in service.

Current status
BEL anticipates a requirement for 100 Rohini radars. BEL delivered the first ROHINI to the Indian Air Force on August 6, 2008. Around 20 radars can be manufactured annually.

The ROHINI has a new Indian-developed antenna which is more advanced than that on the original CAR terms of power handling and beam forming technology.

Seven Rohinis were initially ordered by the Indian Air Force for their radar modernization program. The IAF then ordered 30 more radars after evaluation, making total orders 37 of the type.

The IAF has ordered eight Akash SAM squadrons, and the ROHINIs act as the central early warning system for an Akash squadron deployment.

The Revathi adds two axis stabilization for operation in naval conditions, as well as extra naval modes.

Additional orders are also expected from the Indian Army if they order the Akash (missile) system.

Operators 

Indian Air Force
Indian Army
Indian Navy

References

External links
 3D Surveillance Radar for Air Defense - Rohini 
 3D Tactical Control radar 
 3D Naval Surveillance radar - Revathi 

Military radars of India
Military equipment of India
Military equipment introduced in the 2000s